Teenage Girls is a recording by Toronto alternative rock band Love Kills released in December 2006 (independent).

Track listing 
Teenage Girls (Rijd) – 2:23
Little Angel (Rijd) – 2:34
All Mine (Rijd) – 3:04
Hot Summer Night (Rijd) – 2:28

Credits 
 Heather Flood – vocals, tambourine
 Pat Rijd – guitar, vocals
 Tom Flood – guitar, effects
 Mark Bergshoeff – bass guitar
 Jay Talsma – drums

External links
Love Kills's official webpage for this EP

2006 EPs
Love Kills (band) albums